Moose Lake may refer to:

Communities
In Canada:
 Moose Lake, Manitoba

In the United States:
 Moose Lake, Minnesota
 Moose Lake Township, Carlton County, Minnesota

Lakes
In Canada:
 Moose Lake (Alberta)
 Moose Lake (British Columbia)
 Moose Lake (Manitoba), the largest of these lakes

In the United States:
Moose Lake (Flathead County, Montana) in Flathead County, Montana
 Moose Lake in Granite County, Montana
Moose Lake (Powell County, Montana) in Powell County, Montana
Moose Lake (Lake County, Minnesota) entry point into the Boundary Waters Canoe Area Wilderness

Protected areas
In Canada:
 Moose Lake Provincial Park, Alberta
 Moose Lake Provincial Park (Manitoba)

In the United States:
 Moose Lake State Park, Minnesota

Indian reserve
 Mosakahiken Cree Nation, in possession of Moose Lake 31A, 31C, 31D, 31G, and 31J Indian reserves.

See also
 Moosehead Lake